Rough dropseed is a common name for several plants and may refer to:

Sporobolus clandestinus
Sporobolus compositus (syn. Sporobolus asper)